Olga Fassatiová (1924-2011) was a Czech mycologist known for her work in the biology and ecology of saprophic fungi, including fungi on food, feed, and soils.

Education and career
From 1951-1991, she worked as a teacher and scientist in the Department of Botany at Charles University in Prague. There, she began the fungal culture collection at the university in 1964 and helped establish the Federation of Czechoslovak Collections of Microorganisms. She also described several fungi, including Acrodontium griseum, and authored over 60 journal articles and textbook chapters.

Awards and honors
The fungus Trichoderma fassatiovae was named in her honor.

References

1924 births
2011 deaths
Czech mycologists
Women mycologists
Czech women scientists
Academic staff of Charles University